Yelove is a Malayalam language melodic album by Ajith Mathew.  The album contains a single titled "Moovanthi Chayum Neram," performed by Siddharth Menon and Shreya Ghoshal. Composed by Ajith Mathew, the song was produced by Shine Mathew and released by the label of Yelove Music. The song was released on June 7, 2014. As of 2014, Yelove has achieved 1 million views on YouTube

Development 
Pre-production for the album started on August 1, 2013. The first step of the project, the melody, which depicts the theme, was created. In an interview with Deccan Chronicle, model-turned-actress Aditi Ravi commented that she was extremely delighted to participate in Menon]]'s upcoming album. She also revealed that Shreya Ghoshal would lend her voice to the album, remarking that the song she sang was 'beyond words' and it was a thrilling experience for her that Ghoshal had sung for her. Since May 2014, various covers of the album as well as information regarding the crew members were published on social networking platforms. On May 28, 2014, a video was released featuring Menon talking about the album. A 23-second teaser of the album was released on June 5, 2014. In an interview, composer Ajith Mathew commented that "In western countries, the music album industry is a full-fledged industry. Our aim is to develop such a trend here. We wish to have a music industry parallel to the film industry. To penetrate into the mass market, we need to keep up the quality the public expects. Hence we have used well-known faces for this album".

Release and reception 

The video of "Moovanthi Chayum Neram" was finally unveiled on June 7, 2014. Yelove marks the third independent Malayalam non-film project of Shreya Ghoshal, the others being "Arikilumilla Nee" (Ennennun) and "Kandunjan Kannane" (Nandagopalam). The original MP3 audio of the song was made available for free digital download at Letstune. The story of Yelove is basically about two friends from a circle who ultimately realize their love for each other, though they deny it before. The project redefines love by introducing a new colour, 'Yelove' (a combination of the words 'Yellow' and 'Love'), instead of the traditional red. Singer Siddharth Menon of Thaikkudam Bridge fame makes his acting debut through this video. It is also the first album release of Aditi Ravi. Yelove was a huge hit on YouTube, gathering 100000 views within 3 days of its release. It also became one of the top trending videos from India. Yelove was even aired on Radio Mango 91.9 and Red FM 93.5.

Personnel 
As listed by the official YouTube channel of Ajith Mathew.

Technical and production
 Ajith Mathew – music
 Shine Mathew – producer
 Balu Thankachan – mixing
 Balu Thankachan – mastering
 Karthik Murali – Marketing
 Livingston Mathew – digital editing
 Livingston Mathew – color grading
 Bilu Tom Mathew – cinematography
 Dony Benedict – copywriting

Visuals and imagery
 Siddharth Menon – actor
 Aditi Ravi – actor
 Bilu Tom Mathew – direction
 Ronnie Manuel Joseph – direction
 Athul Ramachandran – associate direction
 Abhijith Jithu – associate direction
 Harikrishnan Prathap – project designing
 Suresh Pisharody – make-up artist
 Suresh Pisharody – hair stylist
 Arjun Haridas – make-up associate
 Sreenu V. – casting direction
 Prem Krishna – title designing

On instruments
 William Francis – keyboard programming
 Sumesh Parameshwar – acoustic guitar
 Sumesh Parameshwar – nylon guitar
 James Taylor – electric violin
 Ajith Mathew – additional programming

Sounding
 Ajith Mathew – music
 Shreya Ghoshal – vocal
 Siddharth Menon – vocal
 Vineeth Kumar – recording engineer
 Tony Joseph – recording engineer
 Pallivathukal Kiran Lal – recording engineer
 Sachin – recording engineer
 Philip Thekkolil – recording engineer

Crew
 Jijo Thomas
 Tom Joseph
 Praveen B.
 Arun K.V.
 Bilin Babu
 Jeffy Mariam Joy
 Sanal Raj
 Prasobh Vijayan
 Renjith Krishnan
 Manu Justine
 Jose Justine
 Jijin John

References

External links 
 Official Facebook Page

2014 albums
Malayalam-language songs
Indian songs
Shreya Ghoshal albums